Zamy Steynovitz (January 15, 1951 - September 1, 2000) was an Israeli  impressionist painter.

Biography
Steynovitz was born in Legnica, Poland and immigrated to Israel in 1957. He aspired to become a painter from childhood, and began his artistic activity prior to leaving Poland. Steynovitz studied at both the Art School in Tel-Aviv and at the Royal Academy of Arts in London.

Upon completing his studies, he began his artistic activity in earnest. He established his place in the art world after exhibiting his work in one-man exhibitions and at art fairs around the world. Steynovitz's images are reflections of both his Jewish and Eastern European heritage. His work suggests the style of Marc Chagall combined with the use of color of the present generation of artists.

Zamy's art displays chromatic and thematic richness. His choice of subjects was strongly influenced by Jewish tradition and folklore, displaying general themes: Paris, still lifes, flowers, angels, circuses and landscapes. In the early stages of his work he used rich pastels, ink, watercolors and light brush strokes. However, during his travels in South America during the 1980s his work was influenced by the new surroundings and enhanced by the local light and colors. His art gained chromatic power; the palette became richer in tones, the fixtures thicker, the backgrounds darker and more colorful. Through these developments Steynovitz's thematic elements persisted in his creation allowing him to develop into a sensitive and mature artist.

Zamy's paintings are a reflection of his Eastern-European Jewish heritage, and they are enhanced by a rich choice of warm tones and colors. He evoked a universal humanistic idea in his creation; man's connection to his heritage and physical surroundings. These are two imperatives aspects in our lives, which during these estranged technological times we should recall.

Zamy expresses a universal humanistic idea in his creations: man's connection to his heritage and physical surroundings. He established his place in the art world after exhibiting his work in one-man exhibitions and art fairs around the world. Zamy is known in the circles of the Norwegian Nobel Institute as a result of his devotion to world peace. Consequently, he is acquainted with many Nobel prize winners like Anwar Sadat, Menachem Begin, the Dalai Lama, Itzhak Rabin, Shimon Peres, Elie Wiesel, Desmond Tutu as well as many other politicians and artists.

Zamy died in September 2000.

References

External links
Zamy Steynovitz Official Website

1951 births
2000 deaths
People from Legnica
Israeli artists
Polish emigrants to Israel
Modern painters